Sébastien Candel (born 21 April 1946) is a French physicist, Emeritus Professor of École Centrale Paris.

He was elected a member of the National Academy of Engineering in 2009 for significant contributions to solving multidisciplinary problems in the fields of combustion, fluid mechanics, aeroacoustics, and propulsion.

Candel is the current President of the French Academy of Sciences (2017-2018).

Education 
Candel studied plasma physics at the École Centrale Paris, where he graduated with a master's degree in engineering science (Diplôme d'Ingénieur) and DEA (Diplôme d'Études Approfondies) in 1968. He subsequently received his PhD from the California Institute of Technology under the supervision of the famous aeronautical scientist Frank E. Marble and Pierre and Marie Curie University, in 1972 and 1977 respectively.

His areas of expertise include fluid mechanics, combustion, propulsion, acoustics and aeroacoustics, signal processing, and hypersonics.

Positions 
 1994-2002 : Member of the advisory board of ONERA
 2002-2004 : President of the supersonic aircraft research group at ONERA
 Since 2007 : Member of the advisory board of AERES
 Since 2010 : Member of the advisory board of CNRS
 Member of the advisory board of the French Institute of Petroleum
 2005-2009 : President of the French National Committee for Mechanics
 Head of combustion research at EM2C Laboratory (École Centrale Paris, CNRS)
 Since 2011 : Full member of the French Academy of Sciences
 Founding member of the French Academy of Technologies
 2015-2016 : Vice President of the French Academy of Sciences
 2017-2018 : President of the French Academy of Sciences
 1978-2014 : Professor at École Centrale Paris
 2001-2011 : Member of the Institut Universitaire de France
 Visiting Professor at Caltech, Stanford, UCLA, UC Berkeley

Contributions 
His academic contributions include:
 More than 190 peer-reviewed journals
 Sections for 40 books
 200 scientific papers
 Author of Mécanique des fluides et Problèmes de mécanique des fluides (Dunod)
 Co-author of Turbulent mixing and Combustion (Kluwer).
Candel was also Vice President of the Combustion Institute from 1996 to 2002, and Associate Editor for Combustion and Flame from 2001 to 2008.

Distinctions 
 Graduate engineer of the École Centrale Paris (1968)
 Prix d'Aumale, French Academy of Sciences (1987)
 Knight (1993), Officer (1998), and Commander (2012) of the Palmes Académiques
 Silver Medal, CNRS (1993)
 Knight (2000) and Officer (2016) of the Legion of Honour
 Marcel Dassault Grand Prize, French Academy of Sciences (2000)
 Aeroacoustics Award, Council of European Aerospace Societies (2004)
 G. Edward Pendray Aerospace Literature Award, American Institute of Aeronautics and Astronautics (2005)
 AIAA Fellow (2005)
 Fellow of Institute of Physics, UK (2004)
 Emeritus Member of AAAF (2004)
 Honorary Doctorate, Université libre de Bruxelles (2005)
 Officer of the National Order of Merit (2006)
 Foreign Member of the National Academy of Engineering, USA (2009)
 Silver medal of the Combustion Institute for an outstanding paper presented at the 32nd Symposium (2010)
 Zeldovich Gold Medal of the Combustion Institute for outstanding contributions to the theory of combustion (2010)
 Member of the Académie de l'Air et de l'Espace (2012)
 Distinguished Alumni Award, California Institute of Technology (2013)

References

External links 
 Candel's personal page on the website of EM2C (Ecole Centrale Paris)

1946 births
Living people
Chevaliers of the Légion d'honneur
Officers of the Ordre national du Mérite
Members of the French Academy of Sciences
French physicists
École Centrale Paris alumni
Pierre and Marie Curie University alumni
California Institute of Technology alumni
Fluid dynamicists
Fellows of The Combustion Institute
Foreign associates of the National Academy of Engineering
Foreign members of the Chinese Academy of Engineering